Rossana Reguillo is a Mexican scholar noted for her analyses of youth, the city as social space, “fear” as a social construct, and the inter-relationship of communication, culture and politics in Latin America. She is currently a professor at ITESO University and Western Institute of Technology and Higher Education. She was a visiting Professor at New York University. Rossana Reguillo is the daughter of a Chiapaneca woman and a Republican communist Madrileño who claimed refugee status in Mexico. She is married to Mexican cartoonist Jabez.

Reguillo has accomplished significant academic work positioning her as a prominent social scientist in Latin America. Her academic rigor and passion have led her to analyze social phenomena and promote social change. For example, her academic analyses of the 1992 drainage explosions in Guadalajara and the participation of youth in the Mara Salvatrucha were not based on an aseptic scientific attitude, which understands research subjects as individuals from which to obtain data in order to elaborate conclusions. Instead, she has always assumed a position (personality) where her roles as social researcher and citizen have allowed her to frame a nuanced understanding of social issues leading to social change.

Work 

Reguillo is a widely cited scholar in Latin America. She has extensively researched such issues as a youth, the city as social space, “fear” as a social construct, and the inter-relationships between communication, culture and politics. Reguillo has analyzed such topics arising from the fields of Communication, Social Anthropology and Cultural Studies, authoring 142 articles, 71 book chapters and seven books, and has also edited/coordinated seven books. Her ample experience in research and teaching has positioned her as a significant academic reference in Latin American scholarship, for which she has been offered diverse visiting positions and visiting chairs at different universities: 
 Professor in the Studies of Social Communication Department of the University of Guadalajara, Guadalajara, Mexico (1995-2001).
 Visiting Professor at the University of Puerto Rico, Río Piedras Campus, Río Piedras campus (School of Public Communication), Río Piedras, Puerto Rico (1997, 2000).
 Tinker Visiting Professor at the Stanford University, Centre of Latin American Studies, Stanford, California (2001).
 UNESCO Chair in Communication at the Autonomous University of Barcelona, Barcelona, Spain (2004).
 UNESCO Chair in Communication at the Pontifical Xavierian University, Bogota, Colombia (2004).

Reguillo has been a professor in the Sociocultural Studies Department at ITESO University, Western Institute of Technology and Higher Education, since 1981, and since 2001 has been Coordinator of its Formal Research Program in Sociocultural Studies (PFIESO by its initials in spanish). She has been a permanent member of the Mexican Academy of Sciences since 2002, and she has achieved the highest possible level (level III) in the National Researchers System of the National Council of Science and Technology of Mexico.

Reguillo has been awarded the 1995 Best Research in Social Anthropology Fray Bernardino de Sahagun Award by the National Institute of Anthropology and History (Mexico); the 1996 Ibero-American Award for Municipal and Regional Investigation by the Ibero-American Capital Cities Union, Spain; and the 2010 Advertising and Women Award for Communication Trajectory by the Municipal Institute of Women and the National Council for the Prevention of Discrimination. She has also been appointed as Advisory Member for Latin America for the Social Science Research Council (2002, USA). In addition, she has been appointed as peer evaluator for the National Council of Science and Technology projects (2000-2004, 2006-2009), judge of the Alejandrina Gaitán de Mondragón Award for the social sciences and humanities areas (2002, 2008, 2009), and member of the international jury for the Essay Contest of the Central University of Venezuela.

Reguillo has participated as a member of editorial committees in diverse journals: Comunicación y Sociedad (Mexico), Estudios sobre las Culturas Contemporáneas (Mexico), Forum (Colombia), Nómadas (Spain), Lugar Comum (Brasil), and Revista de Ciencias Sociales (Colombia). She has also served as a peer reviewer for varied publishing houses: University of Guadalajara (Mexico), Centre of Research and Superior Studies in Social Anthropology (Mexico), Latin American Social Sciences Institute (Argentina), The College of the Northern Border (Mexico), Central University of Colombia (Colombia), Revista Mexicana de Sociología (Mexico), Universidad Autónoma Metropolitana (Mexico), University of Buenos Aires (Argentina), and National University of General Sarmiento (Argentina).

Reguillo has participated extensively in the popular dissemination of academic results through her collaborations in a variety of newspapers such as Siglo 21 (1992-1997), Público-Milenio (1997-2001), La Jornada Semanal, El Ángel (Reforma), Revista Ñ (Clarín, Argentina), and La Nación (Argentina); and she has also been a guest speaker on numerous radio programs.

Reguillo has participated in more than 230 conferences in Brazil, Mexico, Spain, Ecuador, Colombia, Venezuela, Puerto Rico, Peru, Guatemala, El Salvador, Argentina, Uruguay, Bolivia, Costa Rica, Cuba, Chile, Turkey, the USA and Canada.

Reguillo has taught courses and seminars at different universities in Anglo and Latin America, as well as in Spain:

 University of Colima (Colima, Mexico)
 Autonomous University of Queretaro (Queretaro, Mexico)
 Pontifical Bolivarian University (Medellin, Colombia)
 University of Puerto Rico (Rio Piedras, Puerto Rico)
 Central American University (El Salvador)
 University of Buenos Aires (Buenos Aires, Argentina)
 ORT University of Montevideo (Montevideo, Uruguay)
 National University of Colombia (Medellin, Colombia)
 Simón Bolívar Andean University (La Paz, Bolivia)
 Autonomous University of Yucatán (Yucatán, Mexico)
 Metropolitan Autonomous University (Mexico, Mexico)
 Michoacana University of San Nicolas de Hidalgo (Morelia, Mexico)
 National University of La Plata (La Crujia, Argentina)
 Autonomous University of Barcelona (Barcelona, Spain)
 Stanford University (Palo Alto, USA)
 University of Lleida (Lleida, Spain)
 New York University (New York, USA)
 Sacred Heart University (San Juan de Puerto Rico, Puerto Rico)
 Casa de las Americas (La Habana, Cuba)
 Autonomous University of Baja California (Mexicali, Mexico)
 Latin American Social Sciences Institute (Buenos Aires, Argentina)
 Center for Research and Advanced Studies of the National Polytechnic Institute (Mexico, Mexico)
 National University of Cordoba (Córdoba, Argentina)
 Bolivian Catholic University (Cochabamba, Bolivia)
 National University of General San Martin (Buenos Aires, Argentina)
 University of Manizales (Manizales, Colombia)
 Autonomous University of Ciudad Juarez (Ciudad Juarez, Mexico)

References

External links 
 Ibero-American Council of Youth Research
 Blog Viaducto Sur
 Diario de la epidemia

Citation overkill
Academic staff of ITESO, Universidad Jesuita de Guadalajara
Living people
People from Guadalajara, Jalisco
1955 births
Writers from Jalisco